Mona Kim  is a Korean-American designer born in South Korea and educated in the United States. Kim is a multidisciplinary design consultant and a visual artist for cultural and commercial projects (Mona Kim Projects).

Through synthesizing words, images, public spaces, and technology, Kim has directed award-winning projects for her clients: environmental design for museum exhibitions; advertising campaigns for fashion and beauty; branded art installations; interactive sensorial spaces; direction and scriptwriting for audio-visual installations; editorial design.

Life and career
Kim is a Carnegie Mellon University graduate with BFA degree with Honors in Design. She had been selected by IBM Strategic Design branch during her last year in the university to collaborate with leaders in the design field such as Edward Tufte and Sam Lucente. In 1990, Kim moved to Italy which had significantly influenced her work and life philosophy to date. In Milan, she had worked with the late Ettore Sottsass and had been introduced to the instinctual approach to design.

In 1993, Kim moved to New York City where she had begun to expand her work into the fashion & beauty sector, working on advertising campaigns for fashion, beauty, and technology for clients and agencies such as Bloomingdales, Samsung Electronics, Coty, Kenneth Cole, and Arnell Group, as well as working overseas for fashion houses in Italy such as Mandarina Duck and Trussardi on the collection side.

During this time, Kim also started to design environments and "experiential spaces" for thematic museums and exhibitions. Using her influence from fashion and advertising background, and merging it with an intellectual approach to communicating socio-political information, her award-winning projects are described to be highly impactful, with innovative & seamless synthesis of images, space, and message, that boldly engage the public. She had been involved in international projects which include The European Parliament Visitor Center, The Canadian Museum for Human Rights, "Voices" Exhibition for Universal Forum of Cultures Barcelona 2004, Samsung Seocho Brand Showcase, and "Water for Life" Exhibition, one of Expo Zaragoza 2008's main exhibitions with the much acclaimed sculpture of water Splash which she designed with her partners at Program Collective. She has also worked on branded art installations for Uniqlo and scenography for Premiere Vision.

In addition, she has lectured at international conferences for digital culture and creativity such as Artfutura and Broadcat. Kim has also been an adjunct faculty and thesis advisor at Parsons Paris School of Art and Design, adjunct faculty at IDEP, Istituto Europeo di Design, and guest lecturer at Elisava Masters Program.

Kim has worked internationally in New York, Milan and Barcelona. She is presently based in Paris.

Awards
 2001  Honor Awards, Society for Environmental Graphic Design, 50 years of TV and more
 2004  Applied Arts Awards Annual for "Voices" Exhibition
 2004  Good Design Award, Chicago Athenaeum, for "Voices" Exhibition
 2005 D&AD silver nomination, "Voices"
 2005  Laus Trophy for "Voices" Exhibition
 2005  Laus Awards Honorable Mention for "Voices" Catalog
 2005  I.D. Annual Awards, Honorable Mention for "Voices" Exhibition
 2005  Honor Awards, Society for Environmental Graphic Design, "Voices"
 2006  Project awarded for Samsung Electronics Brand Showcase
 2006  Jury for D&AD's Digital Media category
 2007  Shortlisted for the European Parliament Visitor Center competition
 2010  Finalist for international art competition "Design As Reform" Vol.2 – Public Installations category, Dubai
 2012 Iakov Chernikov Conceptual Architecture Prize Nomination (as partner of Program Collective)
 2014 D&AD Awards: Wood Pencil, Branding / Brand Experience & Environments category, for Uniqlo global campaign
 2016 AIGA and Design Observer’s 50 Books | 50 Covers competition: 50 Covers Award, for Moowon Book of Stories

Press & publications 
 "Uniqlo Recruits Mona Kim Projects to Create Holiday Windows in New York", WWD (Women's Wear Daily)
 "Future Experience of Retail", BrandD Magazine
 "Mona Kim Debuts Moowon Site to Draw Attention to Dying Craftsmanship", WWD
 "Program Collective Suspends a Metallic Splash Sculpture in Spain", DesignBoom
 "Mona Kim Unveils Uniqlo’s Holiday Windows", WWD
 Brand Spaces: Branded Architecture And The Future Of Retail Design, Gestalten
 Out of the Box!: Brand Experience between Pop-Up and Flagship, Gestalten
 Building with Water: Concepts Typology Design, Birkhäuser
 Exhibition Design, Linksbooks
 Souls and Machines, catalog of ArtFutura 2008, ed. Montxo Algora
 I.D., 2008 Sept–Oct
 Domus, 2008 Sept
 Diseno Interior, 2008 August
 Creative Review, 2008 July
 The New York Times, 2008 June 15
 I.D. Annual Design Review, 2005, July/August
 La Vanguardia, 2005, May 15
 The New York Times, 2004 February 13
 El País, 2004 February 21
 Axis, 2003 September
 Diseño Interior, 2003 July
 Trains: Language, Mona Kim 1998

References

External links 
 Mona Kim: Projects Website
 moowon Blog
 Program Collective

Living people
1967 births
South Korean emigrants to the United States
American designers